Lasse Qvist (born January 17, 1987) is a Danish professional football player, who plays as a striker for GVI.

Life and career
Born in Roskilde, Qvist started playing football in local clubs Himmelev-Veddelev BK and KFUM Roskilde. From his early years, Lasse Qvist was a fan of F.C. Copenhagen (FCK), and as an 8-year-old boy, he had an FCK-shirt with the number 11 and his name printed on the back.

Aged 14, he switched to the bigger club Lyngby BK and went on to play for various Danish youth national teams. He scored 18 goals in 20 matches for the Danish under-17 national team, and won the 2003 Danish Under-17 Player of the Year award. He also played at the 2003 UEFA European Under-17 Football Championship. After three years at Lyngby, he moved to the youth academy of Dutch team PSV Eindhoven. He had a hard time getting any social contacts with his PSV team mates, as most of them lived in Belgium and went home straight after training.

He moved back to Denmark in 2005, and went on to play for Kjøbenhavns Boldklub (KB), the reserve team of F.C. Copenhagen (FCK). In November 2006, Qvist got his first team début for FCK, when he played the last 30 minutes of the Royal League match against Lillestrøm S.K. at Åråsen Stadium. He was brought on as substitute for Jeppe Brandrup.

Honours
2003 Danish Under-17 Player of the Year
Danish Superliga: 2006-07 (with Copenhagen)

References

External links
Danish national team profile
F.C. Copenhagen profile

1987 births
Living people
Danish men's footballers
Denmark under-21 international footballers
Danish Superliga players
KFUM Roskilde players
Lyngby Boldklub players
PSV Eindhoven players
F.C. Copenhagen players
Association football forwards
FC Helsingør players
People from Roskilde
Holbæk B&I players
Sportspeople from Region Zealand